Hamburg-Steinwerder was a subcamp of Neuengamme, operational from July 1944 to April 1945, whose prisoners were forced to work in Steinwerder shipyard by the German company Blohm & Voss. At least 89 prisoners died.

Sources

 Meyhoff, Andreas. Blohm & Voss im »Dritten Reich«, Eine Hamburger Großwerft zwischen Geschäft und Politik (Hamburger Beiträge zur Sozial- und Zeitgeschichte, Band 38) (in German). Hamburg, Germany: Forschungsstelle für Zeitgeschichte in Hamburg, 2001. .

1944 establishments in Germany
1945 disestablishments in Germany
Blohm+Voss
Subcamps of Neuengamme
History of Hamburg